Big Players FC is a Saint Lucian football club based in Marchand, competing in the Saint Lucia Gold Division, the top tier of Saint Lucian football.

References

Football clubs in Saint Lucia
1996 establishments in Saint Lucia